Women Who Work (Spanish: Mujeres que trabajan) is a 1953 Mexican drama film directed by Julio Bracho and starring Rosita Quintana, Columba Dominguez and Alberto Carrière.

The film's art direction was by Jesús Bracho.

Cast
 Rosita Quintana as Claudia Sandoval 
 Columba Domínguez as Isabel Villada
 Alberto Carrière as Alfredo Berman
 Andrea Palma as Laura Rosales
 Prudencia Grifell as Srita. Benavides
 Eva Martino as Perla Medina
 Anabelle Gutiérrez as Gloria Esparza
 Emperatriz Carvajal as Margarita
 Maruja Grifell as Espectadora desfile de modas
 Diana Ochoa as Empleada de Laura
 Rosario Gutiérrez as Lupe
 Patricia de Morelos as Modelo
 Irlanda Mora as Chica en pensión

References

Bibliography 
 Deborah R. Vargas. Dissonant Divas in Chicana Music: The Limits of la Onda. University of Minnesota Press, 2012.

External links 
 

1953 films
1953 drama films
Mexican drama films
1950s Spanish-language films
Films directed by Julio Bracho
Mexican black-and-white films
1950s Mexican films